El Palo Alto (Spanish: 'the tall stick') is a coast redwood (Sequoia sempervirens) located on the banks of the San Francisquito Creek in Palo Alto, California, a city in the San Francisco Bay Area.

Before European arrival, the land around El Palo Alto was home to the Ohlone Native Americans. Local folklore holds that El Palo Alto was a rest stop for the first European expedition that discovered San Francisco Bay, led by Spanish explorer Gaspar de Portolá in 1769. The tree became widely known with the early-1850s establishment of a highway between San Francisco and San Jose, and as a landmark along the San Francisco–San Jose railroad, construction of which passed the tree in 1863. In 1876, Leland Stanford, co-founder of Stanford University along with his wife Jane Lathrop Stanford, purchased land near El Palo Alto.

Early images and accounts indicate that El Palo Alto once had two trunks. It lost one trunk before 1883—the exact date is unknown—perhaps due to heavy rainfall and erosion of the riverbank. Fearing the tree's total loss, Leland Stanford directed that the riverbank be reinforced with a wooden bulkhead, which was replaced with concrete abutments in 1904 and again in 1911. Train soot suffocated the leaves of the tree's upper limbs, nearby wells lowered the water table, and by the late 1920s the tree was declared moribund. Although it has decreased in stature by some  since the late 1800s, El Palo Alto was ultimately saved by the continuous preservation efforts of the city, local arborists, Stanford University, and Southern Pacific (the owner of the adjacent railroad); a 1997 appraisal concluded that the tree would "persevere and grow for centuries to come". El Palo Alto is featured prominently on the City of Palo Alto logo and the Stanford University seal, and is recognized by the National Arborist Association and International Society of Arboriculture as a tree of historical importance.

Name and background 
El Palo Alto is a coast redwood (Sequoia sempervirens), a giant and long-lived tree species only found near the North American Pacific coast. The redwood has been California's official state tree since 1937. The world's tallest trees are coast redwoods, with the record holder, Hyperion, reaching . At  years, nor is El Palo Alto particularly old; the longest-lived redwoods may approach 2,500 years in age. Although today there are thousands of redwoods in the city of Palo Alto, El Palo Alto is one of only a few not planted by humans. Redwoods generally require wet climates like those found close to the coast, but El Palo Alto is much further inland, close to Palo Alto's northern border with Menlo Park. The tree's location next to San Francisquito Creek provided it the necessary water to survive.

History 
The El Palo Alto tree germinated in AD 940, when the San Francisco Peninsula was populated by the Ohlone people, one of the indigenous peoples of California. This makes the tree contemporaneous with the Viking Age, the Five Dynasties and Ten Kingdoms period in China, or the Fatimid Caliphate in the Islamic world.

Prior to European contact, the Ramaytush speaking subgroup of the Ohlone people lived near to the tree, in the village of Puichon.

Portolá's expedition 

Before conquest by Spanish missionaries in the 18th century, the land around El Palo Alto was home to the Ohlone. According to traditional history, El Palo Alto was the campsite of Spanish explorer Gaspar de Portolá's men between November 6 and 11, 1769. Portolá was traveling north up the California coast from Mexico in search of Monterey Bay, but failed to identify it. Nourished by Ohlone natives, the expedition continued north and on November 1 were greeted with the expanse of the San Francisco Bay. They traveled southwest and arrived at San Francisquito Creek on November 6, 1769, where they camped until November 11.

Visiting the bay in 1774, Father Francisco Palóu came upon a large tree on the creek, considered its location suitable for a new mission, and erected a wooden cross near it. His diary entry indicated the location of Portolá's camp as nearby and is the tree's first appearance in writing. In 1776, Juan Bautista de Anza and Father Pedro Font visited the tree and concluded the creek's flow was too unreliable, instead founding the Mission Santa Clara de Asís—modern day Santa Clara— to the southeast. Font measured the tree with a graphometer: fifty varas (137 feet; 42 m) high and 5.5 varas (15 feet; 3 m) around at the base, noting that soldiers had told him there were larger ones in the mountains. A 1777 map of the bay by Font indicated a large tree on San Francisquito Creek.

Most evidence suggests that El Palo Alto is not the actual tree in Font's map or referenced by early Spanish diarists, who recorded their travels in detail but made no mention of a tree with twin trunks. Local historian Steve Staiger says Portolá's camp may have been under a tree further downstream, later felled by a Spanish military engineer to make a bridge. Two candidates for the true landmark tree, elsewhere along the creek, fell in 1852 and 1911.

Early landmark 

In July 1850, a highway from San Francisco in the north to San Jose to the south was ordered to be built. Previous travelers took narrow trails on horseback or slightly wider tracks on oxcart; it was joked that the road between the two cities was "three miles wide". The highway passed close to El Palo Alto and likely brought it to prominence. The tree was nearly cut down in 1850, but was saved by a timely shipment of lumber.

El Palo Alto was first known as the Palos Colorados, roughly meaning 'red trees'. The earliest known reference to the name "Palo Alto" dates to 1853, and an 1856 official land survey labeled it the "Palo Alto Redwoods"; the name "Rancho of Palo Alto" was used as a disambiguation in 1857. Construction of a railroad by the San Francisco & San Jose Railroad Company, connecting San Francisco to San Jose, passed the tree in 1863, making it an obvious landmark for travelers. The section from San Francisco to "Big Tree Station" at the creek was inaugurated on October 7 that year. The Southern Pacific Transportation Company purchased the company in March 1868; the tree was featured in Southern Pacific advertising. Edward Vischer's Pictorial of California (1870) contains a drawing of the tree with two trunks, noting it to be "one of the very few instances of that mountain monarch [the redwood] being found in the open level country", and suggests that the tree originally had three trunks, describing it as "[t]wins, once a trio".

Land transfers and the Stanfords 

The land beneath and nearby the tree passed through various owners before becoming part of the city of Palo Alto, which did not yet exist. First, the tree lay at the northwest corner of a Mexican land grant called Rancho Rinconada del Arroyo de San Francisquito, which spanned  of oak trees and brush. This corner abutted Rancho San Francisquito to the west and Rancho de las Pulgas to the north. In 1835, the Rinconada grant was first given to Don Rafael Soto, whose father had settled in the de Anza expedition of 1775–76. Soto's widow inherited the grant in 1841. She entered a dispute with the US government—which acquired California as a state in 1850, after the Mexican–American War—over whether her claim was valid.

In 1876, Rancho San Francisquito was purchased by Leland Stanford—who later founded Stanford University with his wife Jane Stanford—for his Palo Alto Stock Farm, a place for breeding and training horses. Following the death of their son in 1884, the Stanfords established a university in his honor on their land. In 1887, Soto's heirs sold their land to a good friend of Leland Stanford, Timothy Hopkins, who used it to develop the nearby town of University Park (see 1894 view). In particular, Hopkins acquired land near El Palo Alto, adjacent to Southern Pacific–owned land, that eventually became the city-owned El Palo Alto Park. Stanford University opened on October 1, 1891, with 440 students in attendance, and prompted the rapid growth of University Park. In 1894 it incorporated as the city of Palo Alto, a new name for which Stanford had a "great fondness".

One trunk falls 

El Palo Alto had two trunks until some time between 1875 and 1882, when the north, more-curved trunk fell. The stump's rings were counted and gave an age of 967 years.

The exact date and cause of the trunk's falling is unknown. A 1900 article in Palo Alto Live Oak dates the falling to the winter of 1879, blaming a freshet. A December 1882 article in The Sacramento Bee states: "Some years ago it had a companion tree, but the latter was undermined by a subterranean stream and fell to the ground." Local historian Guy Miller studied the matter for over two decades and estimated a date of 1885. Miller suggested that railroad records likely to contain definitive information were destroyed in the 1906 San Francisco earthquake and subsequent fire.

The San Francisquito Creek's eroding banks further threatened El Palo Alto. Fearing its loss, after the first trunk fell, Leland Stanford directed a wooden bulkhead to be built reinforcing the tree's side of the creek. In 1904 Jane Stanford ordered the building of a cement wall, which was further reinforced around 1909 by Southern Pacific.

Early Stanford students had a tradition of climbing the tree and placing a flag as high as possible. The day before admissions day of 1909, a Stanford student (or possibly an employee) was marooned and had to be rescued by other students at night time, marking the last known climb.

Declining health 

Smog and disruption of roots from the railroad placed El Palo Alto under existential threat; the adjacent railroad was doubled to two tracks in 1902 and by the 1920s the tree was passed by some 70 trains per day. Nearby wells and water being taken from San Francisquito Creek lowered the water table, depriving the tree of needed water. Stanford botany professor George James Peirce already found in 1901 that the tree's crown was seriously injured, that the railway had caused changes in the nearby soil's drainage, and that a "thicket of suckers" was present around the tree, akin to those seen "around the stump of a felled or fallen redwood of advanced age." In 1915 Peirce planted seven redwoods on university grounds so that one of them could succeed El Palo Alto following its death. Six remain—one was crushed as a sapling by a lawnmower.

The Native Sons of the Golden West, an organization dedicated to the preservation of California landmarks, took stewardship of the tree in 1920. Southern Pacific leased the tree to the Native Sons in 1922 and in 1925 the surrounding land was converted into a park, now El Palo Alto Park. The park spans  and has a pedestrian-bike pathway connecting Palo Alto to Menlo Park. University tree surgeons filled decayed cavities with cement and the tree's base was irrigated using six-inch pipes, sunk eight feet into the earth at regular intervals. Southern Pacific hooked up guy wires to stabilize the tree.

Fearing the tree's death, the Native Sons placed a plaque set in a granite boulder under the tree in 1926, in a ceremony attended by more than a thousand people and featuring speeches from the mayor, a Stanford professor, a Southern Pacific representative, and several Native Sons. Despite continuous preservation efforts, by the late 1920s newspapers declared the tree moribund.

Recovery 

A watering system—dubbed the "Fool the Redwood Plan" by a caretaker—was installed in 1955 to simulate the moisture that redwoods get in their typical habitat, and to wash soot off the foliage; dead branches were removed during installation. It soon became clogged and bent out of shape by high winds, but was fixed in 1958 in a collaboration with the city fire department. In 1961 six local arborists together deemed the tree to be in fair condition, but suffering from smog, insufficient water, termites, and a deteriorating root system. Smaller, "nurse" trees were planted to protect El Palo Alto's root system from compacted soil. Dead wood and termite infestations were progressively removed, mulch was added at the tree's base, and the tree's top was cut off as it died.

El Palo Alto Park was officially named and made a city park in June 1971. With their disbandment in 1974, the Native Sons' lease of the land immediately around the tree from Southern Pacific expired. The city of Palo Alto, who had long cared for the tree, had incorrectly assumed they were part of the lease. The city sent Southern Pacific a new lease in 1978.

The switching of nearby cities to the Hetch Hetchy water system incidentally let the water table return. Together with watering and fertilization efforts the tree was finally adorned with new growth. A 1999 appraisal concluded that "notwithstanding a catastrophic event ... it is expected that the El Palo Alto redwood will persevere and grow for centuries to come."

Legacy 

Once a lone tall tree visible for miles, the tree's decline and the growth of nearby planted trees, such as eucalyptus, have made El Palo Alto much less visible from afar. Preservation efforts continue, including with ground-penetrating radar, "air-spade excavation", drone monitoring of the tree's crown, and a prism attached to its top to track movement. Caltrain plans to make the railroad electric by 2024, which would eliminate the impact of smoke, and will replace the 1902 trestle.

The tree remains prominent on the City of Palo Alto seal, in the Stanford University seal, and as a mascot in the university's marching band. The State of California designated the nearby "Portolá Journey's End" as the second California Historical Landmark in 1932; in 1974 the tree itself was registered with the state as a Point of Historical Interest. In 1987 the National Arborist Association and the International Society of Arboriculture recognized the tree for its historical importance. In 2004, seedlings from El Palo Alto were planted in the American Forests Historic Tree Nursery in Jacksonville, Florida.

See also 
List of individual trees

References

Notes

Sources

Citations

External links 

El Palo Alto at paloaltohistory.org
Stanford University History: Prologue
Historical photographs of San Francisquito Creek, including El Palo Alto
Old illustrated view of Palo Alto, including El Palo Alto

Individual coast redwood trees
Palo Alto, California
History of Santa Clara County, California
History of the San Francisco Bay Area
Native American history of California
Natural history of the California Coast Ranges
Geography of Santa Clara County, California
Tourist attractions in Santa Clara County, California